Peter W. Staub (1910–2000) was a Swiss singer, stage, film and television actor.

Partial filmography

 Mein Traum (1940) - Jimmy
 Gilberte de Courgenay (1941) - Korporal
 Emil, mer mues halt rede mitenand (1941) - Vertreter Bigler
 Bieder der Flieger (1941) - Saniez
 Knall and Fall as Imposters (1952) - Studienrat Hegetschweiler
 Carnival in White (1952) - Fietje Schwedler
 Mask in Blue (1953) - Wat Nu, chinesischer Diener
 The Divorcée (1953) - Scrop
 The Big Star Parade (1954) - Paul Grüter
 Schützenliesel (1954) - Norbert Feldmaier
 Ball at the Savoy (1955) - Viktor
 Three Men in the Snow (1955) - Herr Franke
 Father's Day (1955)
 Request Concert (1955)
 Du mein stilles Tal (1955) - Mikeletti
 Der Frontgockel (1955) - Karl Baumgärtl, Flieger
 Parole Heimat (1955) - Erich
 Yes, Yes, Love in Tyrol (1955) - Harry Frankenstein
 Ein tolles Hotel (1956) - Fred Roller
 Die Rosel vom Schwarzwald (1956) - Klaus-Peter Gemperle
 The Beautiful Master (1956) - Franzl
 The Simple Girl (1957) - Pit
 Der Kaiser und das Wäschermädel (1957) - Herr v. Schwan, Oberlehrer
 Gangsterjagd in Lederhosen (1959) - Gabel - Zeichner
 Grounds for Divorce (1960)
 Wenn d'Fraue wähle (1960) - Julius Zubi
 Musik ist Trumpf (1961) - Mr. Miller
 Adieu, Lebewohl, Goodbye (1961)
 What Is Father Doing in Italy? (1961) - Zöllner Dubi
 Der 42. Himmel (1962) - Herr Beifleiß
 Snow White and the Seven Jugglers (1962) - Burghalter, Friseur
 Holiday in St. Tropez (1964) - Philipp Kussmaul
 The Merry Wives of Tyrol (1964) - Schwimmleher Emil Nass
 Happy-End am Wörthersee (1964) - Dr. Künzli
 Heintje: A Heart Goes on a Journey (1969) - Wache
 Der Fall (1972) - Betrunkener Zuschauer beim 6-Tage-Rennen
 Old Barge, Young Love (1973) - Polizist
 The Maddest Car in the World (1975) - Hotelbesitzer Häckli
 Klassezämekunft (1988) - Heiner 'Hahei' Amstutz (final film role)

References

Bibliography
 Kurt Gänzl. The encyclopedia of the musical theatre, Volume 2. Schirmer Books, 2001.

External links

1910 births
2000 deaths
Swiss male film actors
Swiss male television actors
People from Arbon